The red-necked spurfowl or red-necked francolin (Pternistis afer), is a gamebird in the pheasant family Phasianidae that is a resident species in southern Africa.

Taxonomy
The red-necked spurfowl was described in 1776 by the German zoologist Philipp Ludwig Statius Müller and given the binomial name Tetrao afer. The type locality was later designated as Benguela in western Angola. The specific epithet afer is the Latin word for "African". The species is now placed in the genus Pternistis that was introduced by the German naturalist Johann Georg Wagler in 1832. A molecular phylogenetic study published in 2019 found that the red-necked spurfowl is sister to the grey-breasted spurfowl.

Although many subspecies have been described only four are now recognised:
 P. a. cranchii (Leach, 1818) — north Gabon and south Congo Republic though south, east Democratic Republic of the Congo to central Angola and west Zambia to central Tanzania, west Kenya and Uganda
 P. a. afer (Müller, PLS, 1776) — west Angola, northwest Namibia
 P. a. castaneiventer Gunning & Roberts, 1911 — south and east South Africa
 P. a. humboldtii (Peters, W, 1854) — southeast Kenya and north and east Tanzania to Mozambique, northeast Zambia and east Zimbabwe

Description
It is a generally dark spurfowl, brown above and black-streaked grey or white underparts. The bill, bare facial skin, neck and legs are bright red.

Distribution and habitat
The red-necked spurfowl breeds across the central belt of Africa and down the east coast to South Africa.

Behaviour and ecology
The red-necked spurfowl is a wary species, keeping to deep cover, although it sometimes feeds in open scrub or cultivation if disturbance is limited and there are thickets nearby. The nest is a bare scrape, and three to nine eggs are laid.

Status
Widespread and common throughout its large range, the red-necked spurfowl is evaluated as Least Concern on the IUCN Red List of Threatened Species.

Notes

References 

 Pheasants, Partridges and Grouse by Madge and McGowan,

External links 

Xeno-canto: audio recordings of the red-necked spurfowl
 (Red-necked spurfowl = ) Red-necked francolin - Species text in The Atlas of Southern African Birds
 BirdLife Species Factsheet
 IUCN Red List

red-necked spurfowl
Birds of Sub-Saharan Africa
red-necked spurfowl
red-necked spurfowl